Johannes Gerard van Dillen (20 September 1883, in Amsterdam – 26 December 1969, in Amsterdam) was a Dutch economic historian.

J. G. van Dillen completed gymnasium in Amsterdam and matriculated in the University of Amsterdam, where he completed his doctorate in 1914. He was a privatdozent in economic history at the university 1915-1921. In 1920 he was appointed to the Bureau for the Rijks Geschiedkundige Publicatiën, a series of publications of historical sources. He was also secretary in the editorial committee of the Tijdschrift voor Geschiedenis, Land- en Volkenkunde. Van Dillen was a socialist, but a social democrat who rejected bolshevism. Nevertheless, when Nicolaas Wilhelmus Posthumus left a chair at the Nederlandsche Handels-Hoogeschool in Rotterdam for a chair in Amsterdam and recommended van Dillen as his successor, the school considered him "too red".

After downcuts had forced him out of the RGP in 1933, he managed to get a position teaching at the University of Utrecht. When eventually offered a professorship there, he turned it down, wanting to remain in Amsterdam.

Van Dillen authored several important works on the history of trade and banking in Amsterdam and the Netherlands, and was responsible for editions of primary sources in the same field.

References
T. J. Jansma: Obituary of J. G. van Dillen, from Jaarboek van de Maatschappij de Nederlandse Letterkunde te Leiden 1972-1973, p. 106-111, republished at the website of the University of Leiden.

 

1883 births
1969 deaths
20th-century Dutch historians
Writers from Amsterdam